The Division 2 Féminine, shortened as D2 Féminine, is the second division of women's football in France. Run by the French Football Federation, the league is contested by twenty four clubs.

Clubs

2022–2023 Teams

Group A

Group B

References

External links
  Official website
   FootoFéminin

 
1982 establishments in France
Sports leagues established in 1982
Football leagues in France
Women's football competitions in France
Professional sports leagues in France